Vital Roux (1766–1846) was a French businessman. He notably is co-founder of ESCP business school.

Notes & references 

1766 births
1846 deaths
Barons of the First French Empire
French businesspeople